Just a Gigolo may refer to:

 "Just a Gigolo" (song), a 1929 popular song adapted by Irving Caesar from the Austrian song "Schöner Gigolo, armer Gigolo"
 Just a Gigolo (1931 film), a romantic comedy directed by Jack Conway
 Just a Gigolo (1978 film) (Schöner Gigolo, armer Gigolo), a film starring David Bowie
 Just a Gigolo (TV series), a 1993 British sitcom starring Tony Slattery